Hieracium sylvaticum, wood hawkweed is a species of flowering plant from family Asteraceae that have many lanceolate and ovate leaves with bended forward teeth.

References

sylvaticum